Benaf Dadachanji is an Indian actress, working in Hindi television. She is known for her role as Radhika "Baby" Thakkar, a physically disabled young girl, in the TV series Baa Bahoo Aur Baby.

Early life and career 
Born in Mumbai, she did her schooling from St. Anne's High School.

Benaf started her career with various advertisements. In 1995, she appeared in Santosh Sivan directed Hindi film Halo as Shasha and then in the 1998 film China Gate as Lali. For her performance in Halo, she received Special Jury Award at the 43rd National Film Awards. The jury presented the certificate award for "her charming and natural performance".

She later started her career in Hindi television industry playing various roles in soaps like Hello Dollie, Baa Bahoo aur Baby, Yeh Moh Moh ke Dhaagey, Jhansi Ki Rani and Choti Bahu 2. In 2012 she appeared as Paulomi in Byah Hamari Bahu Ka. She was most recently seen in the web series Baarish.

Personal life 
In February 2019, she married her long time partner Norman. She has a daughter named Ivana born on 18th November 2019.

Filmography

Film

Television

Awards
Dadachanji has won the following awards:
 1995 : International Children Film Festival, Hyderabad in Best Child Artist category
 1996 : 43rd National Film Awards in Special Jury Award category for Halo
 1997 : Children's Filmfest, New York in Best Artist category for Halo

References

External links

Living people
Indian film actresses
Indian television actresses
Actresses in Hindi cinema
Indian soap opera actresses
Special Mention (feature film) National Film Award winners
Year of birth missing (living people)